Prepiella convergens is a moth in the subfamily Arctiinae. It was described by Schaus in 1905. It is found in French Guiana.

References

Natural History Museum Lepidoptera generic names catalog

Moths described in 1905
Lithosiini